Orbitsville is a science fiction novel by British writer Bob Shaw, published in book form in 1975. It is about the discovery of a Dyson sphere-like artefact surrounding a star.

The novel had previously appeared in three installments in Galaxy Science Fiction, in June, July and August 1974. After its publication as a book it won the British Science Fiction Award for the best novel in  1976.

Shaw wrote two sequels, Orbitsville Departure, published in 1983, and Orbitsville Judgement, published in 1990.

External links 

1975 British novels
1975 science fiction novels
Novels by Bob Shaw
Victor Gollancz Ltd books